Golestaneh (also Romanized as Golestāneh; also known as Golastān) is a village in Keraj Rural District, in the Central District of Isfahan County, Isfahan Province, Iran. At the 2006 census, its population was 88, in 27 families.

References 

Populated places in Isfahan County